Sir Kildare Borrowes, 3rd Baronet (c. 1660 – May 1709) was an Irish politician.

He was the son of Sir Walter Borrowes, 2nd Baronet and his first wife Lady Eleanor FitzGerald, daughter of George FitzGerald, 16th Earl of Kildare and Lady Joan Boyle. His mother's family were the richest in County Kildare and this cemented the position of the Borrowes family in the local landed gentry. In 1685, Borrowes succeeded his father as baronet. He was High Sheriff of Kildare in 1697 and again in 1707. Borrowes sat in the Irish House of Commons for Kildare County from 1703 until his death in 1709. His owned Barretstown Castle, which  he inherited  from  his mother, but his main residence was 
at  Gilltown.

He married Elizabeth Dixon, eldest daughter of Sir Richard Dixon and Mary Eustace of Calverstown, County Kildare. She died in 1745 They had two sons and three daughters. Borrowes was buried at Gilltown and was succeeded in the baronetcy by his eldest son Walter. Walter also inherited the Dixon estate at Calverstown from his cousin Robert Dixon.

"Borrowes" was pronounced "burrows".

References

1660s births
1709 deaths
Baronets in the Baronetage of Ireland
Irish MPs 1703–1713
Politicians from County Kildare
Members of the Parliament of Ireland (pre-1801) for County Kildare constituencies
High Sheriffs of Kildare